BBMak are an English band consisting of Mark Barry, Christian Burns and Stephen McNally. Formed in Liverpool in 1996, they sold over three million albums worldwide between 1999 and 2003. The band first achieved success when their single "Back Here" gained popularity in radio stations in Asia and they later signed with Hollywood Records in the U.S. The band reworked their debut album Sooner or Later for an American release in 2000, and the album charted at number 38 on the Billboard 200 chart with "Back Here" becoming a top 20 hit. BBMak's success in the American market helped the band finally break through in their home country.

In 2002, the group released their second album Into Your Head which charted at number 25 on the Billboard albums chart. In 2003, the group dissolved as each member went on to pursue solo careers. BBMak reunited in 2018 after a 15-year absence. They recorded and released a third studio album, Powerstation (2019).

Career

1996-1998: Formation and debut 
Christian Burns, who was raised in Wigan, learned to play rhythm guitar when he was fourteen years old. Burns's father had been a guitarist for the band The Signs, which opened for The Beatles in their early years. Stephen McNally, of Liverpool, aspired to be a guitarist and initially had no ambitions to sing. Mark Barry, of Manchester, got his musical start playing the bagpipes as a kid. The trio met each other while playing with different bands on the Northwest England music circuit and began performing as a group in 1997. McNally came up with the group's band name, which is a combination of the first letters of the band's surnames Burns, Barry, and McNally.

After the group recorded a demo, they traveled to London in the hopes of securing a record deal. The trio would sing outside the offices of major record companies. Once they generated enough industry buzz, BBMak put on a five-song, acoustic showcase in Liverpool. The show drew the attention of record label executives and sparked a bidding war for the band. The band secured a record deal with Telstar Records in the UK in 1998.

1999-2001: Breakthrough and Sooner or Later
The group's debut single "Back Here" was initially released in August 1999 in the United Kingdom, reaching only number 37 on the UK Singles chart that month. The group did not achieve breakthrough success until their debut in North America. The group performed live at Walt Disney World's Epcot park in February 2000; their performance was recorded for an episode of Disney Channel in Concert which focused on both BBMak and M2M and aired on 29 April on Disney Channel. BBMak's debut album, Sooner or Later, was released in the United States on 16 May 2000, peaking at number 38 on the Billboard 200. "Back Here" reached number 13 on the US Billboard Hot 100 chart in July 2000. "Back Here" was subsequently re-released as a single in the UK on 12 February 2001, and the single eventually climbed to No. 5 on the UK Singles Chart and No. 1 for 11 weeks on the US adult contemporary chart. The album would eventually go on to sell over one million copies.

The band appeared in episodes of the ABC show All My Children in May 2000 and opened for Britney Spears on the North American leg of her Oops!... I Did It Again Tour tour. BBMak closed out the year with a sold out 26-date US concert tour and a live performance on MTV's Times Square New Year's Eve 2001 special. The band's next single, "Still on Your Side", was released in 2001 and reached No. 8 in the UK and No. 54 in the US, respectively. That year, BBMak released a DVD called Sooner or Later: Our First Year in America. The band released their third single, "Ghost of You and Me", on 11 May 2001; it peaked at No. 8 on the US adult contemporary chart. The band also appeared on an episode of Disney Channel series Even Stevens. BBMak continued to tour U.S. stadiums in 2001 as a supporting act for NSYNC on the PopOdyssey tour.

In July 2001, the group's track "Miss You More" was featured on the soundtrack to The Princess Diaries. In October of that year, Christian Burns' vocals were featured along with those of 'N Sync's Lance Bass and Joey Fatone, Mandy Moore and True Vibe on the single "On the Line" for the film of the same name; the group's song "Don't Look Down" was also featured on the soundtrack. In 2002, the band covered the song "Always Know Where You Are" by John Rzeznik of the Goo Goo Dolls for Disney's Treasure Planet soundtrack. BBMak also covered the song "Do You Believe in Magic" for Disney's Peter Pan sequel, Return to Never Land.

2002-2003: Into Your Head
In August 2002, BBMak released their second album titled Into Your Head. The album reached No. 25 on the Billboard 200. The first single from the album, "Out of My Heart (Into Your Head)," peaked at No. 56 on the Hot 100 chart and No. 25 on the adult contemporary chart. In 2003, the single "Staring Into Space" was released in select countries. The band split amicably in 2003.

2018-present: Powerstation
On 29 March 2018, Christian Burns confirmed that the band had reunited. On 1 April 2018, the group uploaded a video to Facebook of a performance of their first single, "Back Here". In January 2019, the band confirmed plans for a worldwide tour and a new album. After numerous delays, the first single from their new album, "Bullet Train", was released on 3 May 2019. The album, titled Powerstation, was released on 11 October 2019. In 2021, BBMak released The Lost Tapes, composed of nine B-sides.

Awards and nominations
{| class="wikitable sortable plainrowheaders" 
|-
! scope="col" | Award
! scope="col" | Year
! scope="col" | Nominee(s)
! scope="col" | Category
! scope="col" | Result
! scope="col" class="unsortable"| 
|-
! scope="row"|ASCAP Pop Music Awards
| 2000
| "Back Here"
| Most Performed Song
| 
|

Members
 Mark Barry (born on 26 October 1978 in Manchester, England) – vocals
 Christian Burns (born on 18 January 1974 in Liverpool, England) – vocals, rhythm guitar
 Stephen McNally (born on 4 July 1978 in Liverpool, England) – vocals, lead guitar

Discography

Studio albums

Singles

Music videos
"Back Here" (UK & US version) — directed by Dani Jacobs
"Still on Your Side" (UK version) — directed by Dani Jacobs
"Ghost of You and Me" — directed by Nigel Dick
"Out of My Heart" — directed by Katie Bell
"Staring into Space" — directed by Katie Bell

DVDs/videos
2001 - Music in High Places: Live In Vietnam (DVD/VHS)
2001 - Sooner or Later: Our First Year in America (DVD/VHS)
2002 - Out of My Heart (Into Your Head) (DVD)

References

External links

English pop rock music groups
Hollywood Records artists
EMI Records artists
Telstar Records artists
Musical groups from Liverpool
Musical groups established in 1999
Musical groups disestablished in 2003
British musical trios
Musical groups reestablished in 2018
1999 establishments in England